In enzymology, a 2,3-dihydroxy-2,3-dihydro-p-cumate dehydrogenase is an enzyme that catalyzes the chemical reaction

cis-5,6-dihydroxy-4-isopropylcyclohexa-1,3-dienecarboxylate + NAD+  2,3-dihydroxy-p-cumate + NADH + H+

Thus, the two substrates of this enzyme are cis-5,6-dihydroxy-4-isopropylcyclohexa-1,3-dienecarboxylate and NAD+, whereas its 3 products are 2,3-dihydroxy-p-cumate, NADH, and H+.

This enzyme belongs to the family of oxidoreductases, specifically those acting on the CH-CH group of donor with NAD+ or NADP+ as acceptor.  The systematic name of this enzyme class is cis-2,3-dihydroxy-2,3-dihydro-p-cumate:NAD+ oxidoreductase. This enzyme participates in biphenyl degradation.

References 

 

EC 1.3.1
NADH-dependent enzymes
Enzymes of unknown structure